British Chess Magazine is the world's oldest chess journal in continuous publication. First published in January 1881, it has appeared at monthly intervals ever since. It is frequently known in the chess world as BCM.

The founder and first general editor of the magazine was John Watkinson (1833–1923). He had previously edited the Huddersfield College Magazine, which was the British Chess Magazines forerunner. From the beginning, the magazine was devoted to the coverage of chess worldwide, and not just in Great Britain.

BCM is an independent and privately owned magazine; it is not owned or run by the former British Chess Federation (now the English Chess Federation), with which its name was occasionally confused, apart from the period August 1981 – July 1992.

Apart from being given a new look, the reloaded January 2016 BCM, now in collaboration with Chess Informant, offers more content, more pages and more writers, among them some of the top UK chess grandmasters.

General editors
John Watkinson (1833–1923), founding editor 1881–87.
Robert Frederick Green (1856–1925), editor 1888–93.
Isaac McIntyre Brown (1858–1934), editor 1894–1920.
Richard Clewin Griffith (1872–1955), editor 1920–37, and some months in 1940.
Harry Golombek (1911–95), editor 1938–40, International Master.
Julius du Mont (1881–1956), editor 1940–49.
Brian Patrick Reilly (1901–91), editor 1949–81.
Bernard Cafferty (born 1934), editor 1981–91, FIDE Master.
Murray Chandler (born 1960), editor 1991–99, International Grandmaster.
John Saunders (born 1953), editor 1999 – August 2010.
Steve Giddins (born 1961), editor September 2010 – April 2011, FIDE Master.
James Pratt (born 1959), John Upham (born 1960) and Shaun Taulbut (born 1958), International Master, co-editors May 2011 – December 2015.
Jimmy Adams (born 1947) FIDE Master and Josip Asik (born 1969) FIDE Master, co-editors January 2016  – present.

Columnists

 DJ Morgan. Wrote the "Quotes and Queries" column from 1953 to 1978.
Kenneth Whyld. From 1978 until his death in 2003, Whyld wrote the "Quotes and Queries" column. There is an association in his memory.
 Christopher Ravilious. From 2003 until Autumn of 2009 he wrote the "Quotes and Queries" column.
 Lubos Kavalek. The US GM wrote the controversial "Kavalek File".
 William Hartston. The English IM, Bill Hartston, was one-time games Editor at BCM.
 Sam Collins. The Irish IM was one-time games Editor at BCM.
 Phil Hughes. Until 2010, Hughes wrote the "Quotes and Queries" column. He is now a regular contributor specialising in Nimzowitsch.
 William Ritson-Morry. Ritson wrote the "Posers in Play" column.
 Peter C Griffiths. wrote the "Practical Chess Endings" column.
A. John Roycroft, wrote the "Studies" column.
Charles Michael Bent, from January 1975 until 1985 wrote the Studies column
 John Beasley. For around twenty years concluding in 2010 Beasley wrote the "Endgame Studies" column.
 Ian Rogers. The Australian GM was a very active on-the-spot reporter under Murray Chandler's and John Saunders' editorships. Cathy Rogers, his wife, was the magazine's principal photographer during that period.
 Jonathan Speelman. The English GM wrote the technically advanced "Speelman on the Endgame" column.
 Ian R Watson. From 2010 onwards he has written the "Endgame Studies" column. He is also a new book reviewer.
 Christopher John Feather, wrote the "Problem World" column.
David Friedgood. From 1992 onwards, FIDE Master Friedgood writes the "Problem World" column, retiring in 2011.
 Richard Nevil Coles, wrote the "One Hundred Years Ago" column, a gentle look at the Victorian game.
 Samuel Gideon Franklin, from 2011. FIDE Master Sam Franklin writes the "Sam at the Back" column.
 Kenneth Brian Harman. From 2011, wrote the "Correspondence Chess" column, retiring in the spring of 2012. He is a Correspondence IM.
 Shaun M. Taulbut, aside from chairmanship, pens the "Test Your Chess" column. He is an accountant and International Master.
 John E. Upham. Aside from his editorial/business duties, Upham writes the "Spot the Continuation" column. He is also camera and lens for the readership.
 John S. Hilbert. In 2011, wrote the "Past Practices" column. Also a top US biographer.
 Edward J Dearing. From summer 2011, International Master Dearing writes the 'Dearing's Discoveries' column, a feature about openings.
 Alex McFarlane. From November 2011, International Arbiter McFarlane writes the "Ask the Arbiter" column. He has controlled at Candidates level!
 Carl Gorka. From 2011, Gorka wrote the "Endgames for Learners" column. He is now a contributor from Australia.
 Alan A. Smith. From January 2011 writes the Quotes & Queries column, where history meets chess trivia.
 Alan Dommett. From 2011, Dommett writes the "Practical Play" column. He is an expert on the Blackmar-Diemer Gambit.
 Andrew Martin. From September 2011, International Master Martin writes the "GAMES DEPARTMENT" column. He presents the BCM YouTube channel.
 Nick Pert. From October 2011. International Grandmaster Pert writes the "Endgames for Experts" column.
 Adam Raoof. From October 2011, wrote the "Brits Abroad" column.
 Christopher Jones. From November 2011, Composition GM Jones writes the "Problems" column. He also reviews for the magazine.
 Peter Arthur Williams. From Autumn 2011 writes the "Peter Principle" column on the BCM website. He is one of the UKs youngest chess writers.
 Adam Hunt is an International Master, a professional coach from a chess playing family. He reviews DVDs.
 Tom Rendle is an International Master and coach. From 2012 4NCL (plus other) reports have been regularly written by Rendle.
 John Cox is a lawyer and International Master. From 2012 his detailed reviews have become a part of many issues.
 Julian M Way is a FIDE Master and author of a booklet about the Queen's Gambit Declined. An occasional contributor to BCM, he writes about opening perils from which, he claims, he suffers.
 David Wei Liang Howell. From June 2012, Grandmaster Howell writes the "Game of the Month" Column.
 Andrew P Smith. From July 2012, FIDE Master Smith writes the "Offbeat Chess" column.
 Gary Lane. From August 2012, International Master Lane writes the "Chess Questions Answered" column,
 Chris Fordham-Hall. From May 2013, writes the new "All our Yesterdays" column,
 Julian (Gyula) Meszaros. From July 2013, writes a series of articles entitled "Analogy on the Chessboard".
 Theo Slade. From August 2013, Slade, BCMs youngest columnist at twelve years old, writes "The Shock of the New".
 Yang-Fan Zhou. From September 2013, International Master Zhou is a guest columnist.
 Carl Portman. From October 2013, starts a series of interviews named "In the Spotlight".
 Dan Scoones. From May 2014, writes regular articles with the theme of "Forgotten Master".
 Pete Tamburro. From June 2014, respected author Tamburro writes the "Openings for Amateurs" column.
 FM A. Tyson Mordue. From November 2014, Tyson writes "Club Knight" on various topics.
 Davide Nastasio. From February 2015 became the regular reviewer of DVDs.
 Noam Manella. From March 2015 writes the "Hacktive Chess" column.
 Tamas Fodor. From April 2015 Hungarian Grandmaster Fodor created the "Fodor at the Front" column.
 Mark A. Jordan. From June 2015 Jordan writes "Congress Diary".

Feature articles
 Geoffrey Harber Diggle, Diggle wrote various articles.
 Harry Golombek, Golombek wrote various articles.
 Edward G Winter, Winter wrote various articles.
 Nigel Short, Grandmaster Short writes analytic articles.
 James Plaskett, Grandmaster Plaskett, living in Spain, writes irregular articles.

Regular items
 Media News
 Editorial
 News from the British Isles
 New Books and DVDs Reviewed
 Correspondence Chess
 Local (UK) News
 Spot the Continuation
 Test Your Chess with IM Shaun Taulbut
 News from Abroad
 Problem World
 Studies

Associated publications

B.C.M. Quarterly, number 1: The 24th U.S.S.R Championship, Clarke, Peter Hugh, 19??. 

B.C.M. Quarterly, number 3: 4th Candidates Tournament 1959, Golombek, Harold, 19??. 
B.C.M. Quarterly, number 4: Hastings 1960–1961 International Tournament, ?, 19??. 
B.C.M. Quarterly, number 5: Around the Chess World in 80 Years—Volume 1, Divinsky, Dr. Nathan Joseph, 19??. 
B.C.M. Quarterly, number 6: 1930 Scarborough International Tournament, Golombek, Harold, 1962. 
B.C.M. Quarterly, number 7: 31st U.S.S.R. Chess Championships, 1963, ?, 1963. 
B.C.M. Quarterly, number 8: Around the Chess World in 80 Years—Volume 2, Divinsky, Dr. Nathan Joseph, 1965. 
B.C.M. Quarterly, number 9: Bognor Regis International Congress 1965, Fishlock-Lomax, J. N., 1968. 
B.C.M. Quarterly, number 10: Mir Sultan Khan: All-India Champion 1928, British Champion 1929–1932–1933, Coles, Richard Nevil, 1968. 
B.C.M. Quarterly, number 11: Boris Spassky's Road to the Summit, Cozens, William Harold, 1968. 
B.C.M. Quarterly, number 12: The Ben-Oni Defence, Gelenczei, Emil, 1966. 
B.C.M. Quarterly, number 13: Flank Openings, Keene, Raymond Dennis, 06-05-1970. .
B.C.M. Quarterly, number 14: 5th World Correspondence Chess Championships, Berliner, Hans and Messere, Ken, 05-12-1971. .
B.C.M. Quarterly, number 15: Counter Gambits, Black to Play and Win, Harding, Timothy D., 01-12-1974. .
B.C.M. Quarterly, number 16: Tal Since 1960, Cozens, William Harold, 1974. .
B.C.M. Quarterly, number 17: Staunton, the English World Champion, Keene, Raymond Dennis and Coles, Richard Nevil, 01-12-1976. .
B.C.M. Quarterly, number 18: The Book of the Havana International Masters' Tournament 1913, Capablanca José Raúl, 1976. 
B.C.M. Quarterly, number 19: Mir Sultan Khan, Coles, Richard Nevil, 01-12-1977. .
B.C.M. Quarterly, number 20: London 1982, The Philips and Drew Kings Tournament, Keene, Raymond Dennis, 1979. .
B.C.M. Quarterly, number 21: London 1927: The "British Empire Club" International Tournament, Keene, Raymond Dennis, 04-10-1983. .
B.C.M. Quarterly, number 22: The Lost Olympiad: Stockholm 1937, Cozens, William Harold, 01-09-1985. .
B.C.M. Classic Reprints, number 1: The Grand International Masters' Chess Tournament at St. Petersburg, 1914, ?, 196? (1914). 
B.C.M. Classic Reprints, number 2: London 1899 International Tournament, ?, 196? (1899). 
B.C.M. Classic Reprints, number 3: Der Internationale Kongress Paris 1878, ?, 196? (1878). 
B.C.M. Classic Reprints, number 4: London 1862, ?, 196? (1878). 
B.C.M. Classic Reprints, number 5: Leipzig 1877 Schachkongress, Schallopp, Emil, 196? (1877). 
B.C.M. Classic Reprints, number 6: The Game and Playe of the Chesse 1474, Caxton, William, 01-12-1968 (1474). .
B.C.M. Classic Reprints, number 7: Wien 1873 Der Erste Wiener Internationale Schachkongress 1873, Lehner and Schwede, 196? (1873). 
B.C.M. Classic Reprints, number 8: New York 1916 Rice Memorial Tournament, Sergeant, Philip Walsingham, 196? (1873). 
B.C.M. Classic Reprints, number 9: Karlsbad 1911, Vidmar, Dr. Milan, 1970 (1911). 
B.C.M. Classic Reprints, number 10: Coburg 1904 Kongress, Scellenberg, Schlecter and Marco, 01-12-1972 (1904). .
B.C.M. Classic Reprints, number 11: The Games Played in the London International Chess Tournament 1883, Minchin, James Innes, 01-12-1973 (1883). .
B.C.M. Classic Reprints, number 12: A.V.R.O. 1938 Chess Tournament, ?, 01-12-1973 (1938). .
B.C.M. Classic Reprints, number 13: Deux Cents Parties D'Echecs, volume one, Alekhine, Alexander, 01-12-1973 (?). .
B.C.M. Classic Reprints, number 13: Deux Cents Parties D'Echecs, volume two, Alekhine, Alexander, 01-12-1979 (?). .
B.C.M. Classic Reprints, number 14: Die Schacholympiade Von Hamburg 1930, F. Chalupetzky and L. Tóth, 01-12-1973. .
B.C.M. Classic Reprints, number 15: Das Internationale Schachturnier Nurnberg 1896, Tarrasch, Dr. Siegbert and Chr. Schröder, 01-12-1974 (1896). .
B.C.M. Classic Reprints, number 16: Das Internationale Schachturnier Baden Baden 1925, Tarrasch, Dr. Siegbert, 01-12-1975 (1925). .
B.C.M. Classic Reprints, number 17: Das Champion-Turnier Zu Ostende 1907, Tarrasch, Dr. Siegbert, 1975 (1907). .
B.C.M. Classic Reprints, number 18: Das Internationale Schachturnier Karlsbad 1923, Kagan, Bernhard, 01-12-1977 (1923). .
B.C.M. Classic Reprints, number 19: Mährisch-Ostrau 1923 Internationales Schachmeister-Turnier, Kagan, Bernhard, 01-12-1978 (1923). .
B.C.M. Classic Reprints, number 20: World Chess Championship 1948, Golombek, Harold, 01-03-1982 (1949). .
B.C.M. Classic Reprints, number 21: Bad Kissingen 1928, Tartakover, Dr. Savielly Grigorievitch, 197? (1928). .
B.C.M. Classic Reprints, number 22: 1923 – 1932 An Anthology, Cafferty, Bernard, 1986. .
B.C.M. Classic Reprints: Capablanca's Hundred Best Games of Chess, Golombek, Harold, 05-04-1995 (1947). .
B.C.M Guide to the Openings in 178 Games, Young, Francis Joseph (aka "Hobart"), ??-??-1898.
Selection of Chess Problems by Philipp Klett, Klett, Philipp; Beasley, J. D. (Ed.), 01-12-1978. .
Mattison's Chess Endgame Studies, Whitworth, T. G., 01-12-1987. .

See also 
 List of chess periodicals

References

Giddins, Steve. British Chess Magazine, December 2010, p. 622–625. "Bernard Cafferty – 30 years at his post!". ISSN 0007-0440.
Diggle, Geoffrey Harber. British Chess Magazine, January 1955, p. 34–36. "The BCM – A Reader's Retrospect". ISSN 0007-0440.
Reilly, Freddy. British Chess Magazine, December 1980, p. 593–626. "Our First Hundred Years 1881 – 1980". ISSN 0007-0440.
Saunders, John. British Chess Magazine, April 2005, p. 204–5. ISSN 0007-0440.
Golombek, Harry. The Encyclopedia of Chess. Batsford, 1977. .
Hooper, David & Whyld, Kenneth. The Oxford Companion to Chess. Oxford UP, 1984. .

External links

British Chess Magazine
Biography of John Watkinson
Huddersfield Chess Club
The BCM – A Reader's Retrospect by G.H. Diggle

1881 in chess
Chess magazines published in the United Kingdom
Chess in the United Kingdom
Monthly magazines published in the United Kingdom
Magazines established in 1881
1881 establishments in the United Kingdom